The State Council of Joseon or Uijeongbu was the highest organ of government under the Joseon Dynasty of Korea.  It was led by three officials known as the High State Councillors.  The Councilors were entrusted to deliberate over key problems of state, advising the king, and conveying royal decisions to the Six Ministries.

The Council was formed under the reign of Jeongjong, just before Taejong seized power in 1400.  It replaced an earlier institution called the "Privy Council," which had been dominated by Jeong Dojeon and other key figures behind the dynasty's founding. The State Council gradually declined in importance over the 500 years of Joseon's rule. Finally, the Council was replaced by the cabinet in 1907, forced by Japanese intervention

Today, there's a city which was named after this organ (Uijeongbu) in Gyeonggi-do.

Structure
The State Council comprised:
 the Chief State Councilor (영의정 領議政), rank 1a
 the Left and Right State Councilors (좌ㆍ우의정 左右議政), both rank 1a
 the Left and Right Chanseong (좌ㆍ우찬성 左右贊成), both rank 1b 
 the Left and Right Chamchan (좌ㆍ우참찬 左右參贊), both rank 2a
 additionally two Sain (사인 舍人), rank 4a ; one Geomsang (검상 檢詳), rank 5a ; two Sarok (사록 司錄), rank 8a .

Sources

References

See also
Joseon Dynasty politics
History of Korea

Joseon dynasty